Carbon-Blanc is a commune in the Gironde department in Nouvelle-Aquitaine in southwestern France. The commune was created in 1853 when it was separated from neighboring Bassens by decree of Napoleon III.

Population

Sister cities
Carbon-Blanc has 2 sister cities:
  Großostheim, Germany
  San Martín de Valdeiglesias, Spain

See also
Communes of the Gironde department

References

Communes of Gironde